The African Centre for Gene Technologies (ACGT) (Pretoria) is located on the Experimental Farm of the University of Pretoria campus, and was established by Council for Scientific and Industrial Research (CSIR), the University of Pretoria, the University of the Witwatersrand, the University of Johannesburg and the Agricultural Research Council (ARC). The aim is to create a collaborative network of excellence in advanced biotechnology, with specific focus on the "-omics".

History
ACGT is a product of the
Southern Education and Research Alliance (SERA) and
was established in 2001 as the
SERA biotechnology task team.
ACGT has since grown into a
regional
initiative.

External links
 African Centre for Gene Technologies web site
 CSIR web site
 University of Pretoria web site
 University of the Witwatersrand web site
 University of Johannesburg web site
 Agricultural Research Council web site

References

Genetics or genomics research institutions
Research institutes in South Africa
University of Pretoria
University of the Witwatersrand
University of Johannesburg